West Boundary Street Historic District is a national historic district located at Newberry, Newberry County, South Carolina.  The district encompasses six contributing buildings and one contributing site in a residential neighborhood of Newberry.  The four residences date between 1840 and 1935, and include examples of the Greek Revival, a Victorian raised cottage, and Bungalow styles.

It was listed on the National Register of Historic Places in 1980.

References 

Historic districts on the National Register of Historic Places in South Carolina
Victorian architecture in South Carolina
Greek Revival architecture in South Carolina
Historic districts in Newberry County, South Carolina
National Register of Historic Places in Newberry County, South Carolina
Newberry, South Carolina